Richard Digges (died 1634) was an English lawyer and politician who sat in the House of Commons from 1597 to 1629.

Digges was the son  John Digges of Purton, Wiltshire and his wife Elizabeth Noddall, of Yorkshire. He was educated at Oxford University and was awarded BA on 27 May 1579. He studied law at New Inn and then at Lincoln's Inn in  1581 and was called to the bar in 1589.  In November 1590 Digges was employed as an Exchequer surveyor by Lord Burghley.  

In 1597, he was elected Member of Parliament for Marlborough and was re-elected in every election until 1628.  He was of counsel to Marlborough before 1603 and became Mayor of Marlborough in 1608. He was a bencher of Lincoln's Inn and autumn reader in 1608 and in 1614 Keeper of the Black Book. He was treasurer from 1616 to 1617 and Lent reader in 1619. He became serjeant-at-law in 1623. 
 
Digges was buried at Marlborough on 26 January 1634. He had married firstly Margaret Gore, daughter of Richard Gore of Aldrington, Wiltshire and had a son and two daughters. He married secondly Elizabeth Waldron, daughter of Thomas Waldron.

References

Year of birth missing
1634 deaths
Alumni of the University of Oxford
Members of Lincoln's Inn
Mayors of Marlborough
English MPs 1597–1598
English MPs 1601
English MPs 1604–1611
English MPs 1614
English MPs 1621–1622
English MPs 1624–1625
English MPs 1625
English MPs 1626